Oru-Ijebu is a semi-urban town located in Ijebu North local government area of Ogun State, South-Western Nigeria. It is bordered by Ago-Iwoye in Ogun State and shares close territorial boundaries with Ijebu Igbo, the headquarters of Ijebu North, Ogun state. The town is alternatively known as Ijebu-Oru and according to the 2006 census has a population of about 27,000 people. The traditional ruler and community leader of the town is called the Oloru of Oru-Ijebu and he is Oba Abdulrasaq Olufemi Adebanjo. The town houses a refugee camp which is located on the outskirts 500m away from the town, housing refugees from Liberia and Sierra-Leone. Oru town is rich in various types of precious stones and metals.

Notable people
Cornelius Taiwo
Dele Odule

References

Populated places in Ogun State